MS 2000 or variation, may refer to:

 Korg MS2000, music synthesizer
 General Motors MS2000, an automotive platform, variant of the GM W platform
 MOSAID MS2000, a computer memory tester

See also

 Microsoft Windows Me (Millennium Edition), aka MS 2000; an operating system
 Microsoft Windows 2000, aka MS 2000; an operating system
 Microsoft Office 2000, aka MS 2000; an office productivity software package
 
 
 MS2 (disambiguation)
 MS20 (disambiguation)
 MS-200 (disambiguation)
 2000 (disambiguation)
 MS (disambiguation)